Charles Dymoke (died 1611), of Howell, Lincolnshire, was an English politician.

He was a Member (MP) of the Parliament of England for Lincoln in 1593.

References

16th-century births
1611 deaths
People from North Kesteven District
English MPs 1593